Calvin Ralph Stiller, OC, OOnt, MD, FRCP(C), FCAHS, DSc(hon), LLD(hon), (born February 12, 1941), is a highly esteemed Canadian physician, scientist, and entrepreneur. Although retired from a long and distinguished career as a member of the Schulich School of Medicine & Dentistry at Western University in London, Ontario, Stiller's impact on the Canadian health care system remains profound. His work in the area of organ transplantation and immunology, especially, was path-breaking in Canada and elsewhere, as was his creation of and support for various streams of top-level medical research, innovation, investment, and market application.

Early Life and Education

Stiller hails from the tiny prairie town of Naicam, Saskatchewan. He was the third of five children born to the Rev’d Hilmer Stiller, a minister ordained by the Pentecostal Assemblies of Canada, and his wife Mildred (née Parsons). Stiller spent his childhood years in Naicam, the kind of town that Wallace Stegner would write about later evocatively in his celebrated prairie memoir, Wolf Willow. Stiller's lifelong love of horses – of which the Ontario farm where he resides today is a reflection – began here. Later, the family would move to Tisdale, and then finally in 1947 to the much larger Saskatoon. Here, Stiller would complete his schooling, which included graduating from Bedford Road Collegiate, followed by two years of undergraduate pre-medical studies in Arts and Science at the University of Saskatchewan. At the age of 20 in 1961, Stiller entered the medical faculty at the U of S, just as the then Premier of Saskatchewan, Tommy Douglas, was leading the controversial campaign to bring about a comprehensive, national system of health care in Canada. Always interested in science and medicine, Stiller had aspired from an early age to be a physician, in large part because of the inspiring example of a local doctor, Abe Dick, who had given outstanding care to his father who suffered from severe complications in kidney function owing to Bright's Disease. ‘I want to be him’, he told his mother at the age of 12 referencing Dr. Dick, ‘and I never varied’.1
 
	As well as hoping to achieve the high bar of attending medical school, during his childhood and youth Stiller demonstrated a pronounced entrepreneurial bent, which would come to fruition many years later. When they were growing up, the Rev’d Stiller had encouraged his children to think always about how to serve others, and there were three professions especially that readily exemplified the virtue: minister, teacher, and doctor. This paternal ideal from a man whom he ‘loved dearly’ left an indelible mark on the young Stiller.2  But in the meantime, in order to save money, and already ‘being a little entrepreneur at heart’, as he recalls, Stiller set up a milk bar at school (the first such initiative to provide food in the local school system), delivered newspapers along the longest route in Saskatoon, co-owned and serviced pen vending machines distributed throughout the city, and, later, opened Skateland Roller Rink, which offered a venue for teenagers to burn off energy during the North American roller-skating craze of the late 1950s.3 

Career

	Following the completion of his MD degree in 1965, Stiller set off to pursue five years of post-graduate fellowship studies at what was then called the University of Western Ontario in London, Ont., followed by a year spent at the University of Alberta in Edmonton. During these years of advanced training under leaders in the field such as Dr. Ramsay Gunton and Dr. John Dossetor, Stiller developed a specialization in what was an obvious natural interest in kidney disease, as well as in the related areas of transplantation – a growing field – immunology, and infection. Returning to Western in 1971, and having gained by then his fellowship designation of FRCP(C), he embarked on a long tenure at University Hospital, London. Beginning in 1972, he was appointed Chief of Nephrology and Transplantation, and later, Director of Immunology at the John P. Robarts Institute.

	From those early years in the 1970s through to the first decade of the twenty-first century, Stiller would set a hectic pace for himself of work, research, advocacy and medical-based entrepreneurship. His name can be found on some 265 peer-reviewed scientific papers, which is an astonishing level of published research for a physician who, along the way, had married the former Angie Apolinario, had a family of six children, a full case-load of patients, and held numerous administrative responsibilities. Additionally, Stiller had found the time to be an early adopter of computerized patient records, as well as to co-create a telephone-based medical service, which he would take public. This service became the first form of Telemedicine offered by the Government of Ontario.4  These foundational years of his career, especially the pioneering days of organ transplantation, were very exciting, he says, but also hard-going emotionally because a large number of transplant recipients died. Still, ‘some of my best memories’, he recalls, ‘are of driving home at two in the morning from the ICU after a family had agreed to donate a loved one’s organs, and knowing that someone facing imminent death was being prepped for the OR’.5  A deep and abiding commitment to the eventual widespread success of organ transplantation led to Stiller's establishing the Multi-Organ Transplant Service and the Canadian Centre for Transplantation in London, over which he acted as chief from 1984 until 1996. Organ rejection was (and remains) a major challenge in the field and Stiller's key involvement as principal investigator in the early 1980s in the clinical trials and market development of the drug Cyclosporine for use as a first-line therapy for transplant rejection stands as a towering achievement in revolutionizing the success rate of organ transplants worldwide. In 1990, he published the book, Lifegifts: The Real Story of Organ Transplantation, in which he, along with his brother, the Rev’d Brian Stiller, recounts this remarkable history.6  In a similar way, Stiller's leading role amongst a team of researchers had proved in 1984 that human Type I Diabetes was an autoimmune disorder and therefore amenable to a regime of immunosuppressant or immunomodulant treatment. It was a singular breakthrough that was much-praised by the medical community, as well as by many others, including the late Professor Michael Bliss, the renowned University of Toronto medical historian and biographer of the Nobel prize-winning co-discoverer of insulin, Sir Frederick Banting.7

	At the same time that Stiller was carrying out his multi-faceted hospital and laboratory work, he was helping also to enlarge steadily the capacity for advanced medical research and development in Canada. The list in this regard is long. Of especial importance is the Canadian Medical Discoveries Fund, which he founded, the largest venture capital fund in Canadian medical history, which since its inception has raised and managed over half a billion dollars in assets. In addition, Stiller's participation on medical-related boards and foundations is equally extensive. For example, he served as founder and chair of the Ontario Institute for Cancer Research, as well as the chair of Genome Canada. Along with Dr. John Evans, a former president of the University of Toronto, and Ken Knox, Stiller catalyzed the founding of the Medical and Related Science (MaRS) Discovery District in downtown Toronto, and then served as its director. Launched in 2000, and created to bring publicly funded medical and related sciences research to Canadian and global markets, as of today, the MaRS ‘ecosystem’ has created tens of thousands of jobs and raised in excess of one billion dollars in capital investments.8  To Stiller, MaRS is one of the chief ways of pushing the results of Canadian science to be an end-product, ready for market export. That's happening already, but he's confident that even more of it is in store. ‘It will occur in all its glory and potential’, he says, ‘You can take this to the bank’.9  Meanwhile, around the same time, Stiller was invited by the then Premier of Ontario, Mike Harris, to chair the Ontario Research and Development Challenge Fund, which, together with the Ontario Innovation Trust, would provide over $1.2-billion in R&D support during the following decade to Ontario universities in a unique alliance with research-intensive businesses.

Awards and Distinctions

‘If you want to see the monuments to Cal Stiller’, observes Dr. Henry Friesen, professor emeritus of medicine at the University of Manitoba, a former president of the Medical Research Council of Canada, and himself a giant of Canadian medicine, ‘it’s like they said about Sir Christopher Wren, ‘look all around – they’re everywhere’.10  Stiller's outsized and highly influential imprint on Canadian medicine, medical research, and health care has been recognized through a passel of awards ranging from business-based, to medical, to university, to signal honours bestowed upon him by both the Province of Ontario and the country. For example, he was named Ontario Entrepreneur of the Year in 1996. In 1999, Western University established the Novartis/Calvin Stiller Chair in Xenotransplantation. The next year, he was named a Member of the Order of Ontario, to go along with having been made a member of the Order of Canada a few years earlier (he has since been raised to the level of Officer). In 2002, the namesake Stiller Centre for Technology Commercialization was opened in London. He has been given honorary degrees by a number of Canadian universities, as well as included by his alma mater, the University of Saskatchewan, in its '100 Graduates of Influence’, an all-time list celebrated to mark the university's centenary in 2007.

Finally, a few years later in 2010, Stiller was inducted into the Canadian Medical Hall of Fame. Back in 1994, at the suggestion of his son, Tim, during a visit to the Hockey Hall of Fame in Toronto, Stiller had begun to think about creating a medical hall of fame for Canada in order to honour the great achievements of national luminaries in the field such as Banting, Charles Best, Emily Stowe, Wilder Penfield, and many others. Soon thereafter, and with the help of J. Allyn Taylor, a leading banker and the Chancellor of Western University, the CMHF in London came into being, the only one of its kind in the world. Stiller's own election to it later, at the hands of an autonomous committee, would move him deeply. In 2010 also, he was made a Distinguished Fellow of the Canadian Academy of Health Sciences (one of only ten allowed), and won the highly prestigious Canada Gairdner Wightman Award, the preeminent medical prize in the country, in recognition of a lifetime's work in organ transplantation and the immunology of Type I Diabetes. In 2011, Stiller was named to give the annual Killam Address. In so doing, he recalled the Canadian Olympic team-inspired title: ‘Can we “Own the Podium” in Science and Technology?’. Clearly, the long ago words of his minister-father enjoining him ‘to serve’ have been the lodestar of Calvin Stiller's life. He is, as the Globe and Mail called him upon his retirement in 2010, a true Canadian ‘nation builder’.11  A nation of -- Stiller hopes in echoing the words of Canada's former Governor General, David Johnston -- ‘keener minds and kinder hearts’.12 

Selected External Sites and Further Reading

https://gairdner.org/award_winners/calvin-stiller/

https://cahs-acss.ca/distinguished fellows/

http://www.usask.ca/100/alumni/calvin_stiller.php

http://killamlaureates.ca/doc/2011KillamLecture.pdf

http://youtube.com/watch?v=rftpYJ5ecfk

http://www.jstor.org/stable/1693714?seq=1

Stiller, Calvin. Lifegifts: The Real Story of Organ Transplantation (Toronto: Stoddart, 1990).

References 
  1. Interview with the subject, April 24, 2020.
  2. Ibid.
  3. The Globe and Mail, December 28, 2010.
  4. The Canadian Sportsman, April 29, 2010.
  5. Ibid.
  6. Calvin Stiller, Lifegifts: The Real Story of Organ Transplantation (Toronto: Stoddart, 1990).
  7. Michael Bliss, The Discovery of Insulin (Toronto: University of Toronto Press, 1982); Banting: a Biography (Toronto: University of Toronto Press, 1984).
  8. Alex Philipiddis, ‘Incubators Blossom along with their Startups’, Genetic Engineering & Biotechnology News (June 15, 2014), 34 (12). See, also, http://marsdd.com
  9. The Canadian Sportsman, op cit.
 10. The Globe and Mail, op cit.
 11. Ibid.
 12. http://www.canada.com (January 6, 2013).

1941 births
Living people
Canadian transplant surgeons

Officers of the Order of Canada
Members of the Order of Ontario
University of Saskatchewan alumni